Herpetospermum is a genus of flowering plants belonging to the family Cucurbitaceae.

Its native range is Himalaya to Southern Central China and Northern Myanmar.

Species:

Herpetospermum darjeelingense 
Herpetospermum operculatum 
Herpetospermum pedunculosum 
Herpetospermum tonglense

References

Cucurbitaceae
Cucurbitaceae genera